The Dauria Constituency (No.44) is a Russian legislative constituency in Zabaykalsky Krai. In 1993-2007 the constituency was based in South-Eastern Chita Oblast. In 2008 Chita Oblast merged with Agin-Buryat Autonomous Okrug to form Zabaykalsky Krai, and newly-configured Dauria constituency now covers western half of Chita, Southern Zabaykalsky Krai, as well as territory of the former Agin-Buryat Autonomous Okrug (previously, had its own constituency).

Members elected

Election results

1993

|-
! colspan=2 style="background-color:#E9E9E9;text-align:left;vertical-align:top;" |Candidate
! style="background-color:#E9E9E9;text-align:left;vertical-align:top;" |Party
! style="background-color:#E9E9E9;text-align:right;" |Votes
! style="background-color:#E9E9E9;text-align:right;" |%
|-
|style="background-color:"|
|align=left|Vladimir Surenkov
|align=left|Independent
|
|26.81%
|-
|style="background-color:"|
|align=left|Aleksandr Epov
|align=left|Independent
| -
|25.50%
|-
| colspan="5" style="background-color:#E9E9E9;"|
|- style="font-weight:bold"
| colspan="3" style="text-align:left;" | Total
| 
| 100%
|-
| colspan="5" style="background-color:#E9E9E9;"|
|- style="font-weight:bold"
| colspan="4" |Source:
|
|}

1995

|-
! colspan=2 style="background-color:#E9E9E9;text-align:left;vertical-align:top;" |Candidate
! style="background-color:#E9E9E9;text-align:left;vertical-align:top;" |Party
! style="background-color:#E9E9E9;text-align:right;" |Votes
! style="background-color:#E9E9E9;text-align:right;" |%
|-
|style="background-color:"|
|align=left|Viktor Kolesnikov
|align=left|Agrarian Party
|
|37.82%
|-
|style="background-color:"|
|align=left|Anatoly Zaytsev
|align=left|Independent
|
|19.38%
|-
|style="background-color:"|
|align=left|Ivan Chesnykh
|align=left|Liberal Democratic Party
|
|10.24%
|-
|style="background-color:"|
|align=left|Vladimir Surenkov (incumbent)
|align=left|Independent
|
|9.11%
|-
|style="background-color:#23238E"|
|align=left|Anatoly Varyanov
|align=left|Our Home – Russia
|
|6.78%
|-
|style="background-color:#959698"|
|align=left|Valentin Logunov
|align=left|Derzhava
|
|5.05%
|-
|style="background-color:#000000"|
|colspan=2 |against all
|
|9.54%
|-
| colspan="5" style="background-color:#E9E9E9;"|
|- style="font-weight:bold"
| colspan="3" style="text-align:left;" | Total
| 
| 100%
|-
| colspan="5" style="background-color:#E9E9E9;"|
|- style="font-weight:bold"
| colspan="4" |Source:
|
|}

1999

|-
! colspan=2 style="background-color:#E9E9E9;text-align:left;vertical-align:top;" |Candidate
! style="background-color:#E9E9E9;text-align:left;vertical-align:top;" |Party
! style="background-color:#E9E9E9;text-align:right;" |Votes
! style="background-color:#E9E9E9;text-align:right;" |%
|-
|style="background-color:"|
|align=left|Yaroslav Shvyryaev
|align=left|Independent
|
|28.95%
|-
|style="background-color:"|
|align=left|Yury Lossky
|align=left|Independent
|
|28.08%
|-
|style="background-color:"|
|align=left|Aleksandr Epov
|align=left|Independent
|
|12.42%
|-
|style="background-color:"|
|align=left|Sergey Belonogov
|align=left|Independent
|
|9.65%
|-
|style="background-color:"|
|align=left|Yevgeny Kasyanov
|align=left|Independent
|
|7.13%
|-
|style="background-color:#000000"|
|colspan=2 |against all
|
|11.24%
|-
| colspan="5" style="background-color:#E9E9E9;"|
|- style="font-weight:bold"
| colspan="3" style="text-align:left;" | Total
| 
| 100%
|-
| colspan="5" style="background-color:#E9E9E9;"|
|- style="font-weight:bold"
| colspan="4" |Source:
|
|}

2003

|-
! colspan=2 style="background-color:#E9E9E9;text-align:left;vertical-align:top;" |Candidate
! style="background-color:#E9E9E9;text-align:left;vertical-align:top;" |Party
! style="background-color:#E9E9E9;text-align:right;" |Votes
! style="background-color:#E9E9E9;text-align:right;" |%
|-
|style="background-color:"|
|align=left|Yury Lossky
|align=left|Independent
|
|46.51%
|-
|style="background-color:"|
|align=left|Yaroslav Shvyryaev (incumbent)
|align=left|Independent
|
|27.39%
|-
|style="background-color:"|
|align=left|Vera Shavrova
|align=left|Independent
|
|12.33%
|-
|style="background-color:"|
|align=left|Sergey Vinitsky
|align=left|Liberal Democratic Party
|
|2.88%
|-
|style="background-color:#000000"|
|colspan=2 |against all
|
|9.10%
|-
| colspan="5" style="background-color:#E9E9E9;"|
|- style="font-weight:bold"
| colspan="3" style="text-align:left;" | Total
| 
| 100%
|-
| colspan="5" style="background-color:#E9E9E9;"|
|- style="font-weight:bold"
| colspan="4" |Source:
|
|}

2004

|-
! colspan=2 style="background-color:#E9E9E9;text-align:left;vertical-align:top;" |Candidate
! style="background-color:#E9E9E9;text-align:left;vertical-align:top;" |Party
! style="background-color:#E9E9E9;text-align:right;" |Votes
! style="background-color:#E9E9E9;text-align:right;" |%
|-
|style="background-color:"|
|align=left|Yevgeny Blokhin
|align=left|Independent
|
|33.33%
|-
|style="background-color:"|
|align=left|Viktor Kurochkin
|align=left|Independent
|
|24.70%
|-
|style="background-color:"|
|align=left|Yaroslav Shvyryaev
|align=left|Independent
|
|21.21%
|-
|style="background-color:#000000"|
|colspan=2 |against all
|
|16.87%
|-
| colspan="5" style="background-color:#E9E9E9;"|
|- style="font-weight:bold"
| colspan="3" style="text-align:left;" | Total
| 
| 100%
|-
| colspan="5" style="background-color:#E9E9E9;"|
|- style="font-weight:bold"
| colspan="4" |Source:
|
|}

2016

|-
! colspan=2 style="background-color:#E9E9E9;text-align:left;vertical-align:top;" |Candidate
! style="background-color:#E9E9E9;text-align:left;vertical-align:top;" |Party
! style="background-color:#E9E9E9;text-align:right;" |Votes
! style="background-color:#E9E9E9;text-align:right;" |%
|-
|style="background-color:"|
|align=left|Vasilina Kulieva
|align=left|Liberal Democratic Party
|
|44.13%
|-
|style="background-color:"|
|align=left|Yury Gayduk
|align=left|Communist Party
|
|16.72%
|-
|style="background-color:"|
|align=left|Andrey Popov
|align=left|A Just Russia
|
|12.47%
|-
|style="background:"| 
|align=left|Oleg Fedorov
|align=left|Civic Platform
|
|7.66%
|-
|style="background-color:"|
|align=left|Aleksandr Shchebenkov
|align=left|Rodina
|
|4.40%
|-
|style="background-color:"|
|align=left|Gennady Shchukin
|align=left|Patriots of Russia
|
|4.13%
|-
|style="background-color:"|
|align=left|Igor Linnik
|align=left|Yabloko
|
|2.25%
|-
| colspan="5" style="background-color:#E9E9E9;"|
|- style="font-weight:bold"
| colspan="3" style="text-align:left;" | Total
| 
| 100%
|-
| colspan="5" style="background-color:#E9E9E9;"|
|- style="font-weight:bold"
| colspan="4" |Source:
|
|}

2021

|-
! colspan=2 style="background-color:#E9E9E9;text-align:left;vertical-align:top;" |Candidate
! style="background-color:#E9E9E9;text-align:left;vertical-align:top;" |Party
! style="background-color:#E9E9E9;text-align:right;" |Votes
! style="background-color:#E9E9E9;text-align:right;" |%
|-
|style="background-color:"|
|align=left|Yury Grigoryev
|align=left|A Just Russia — For Truth
|
|24.26%
|-
|style="background-color:"|
|align=left|Yekaterina Fisun
|align=left|United Russia
|
|21.39%
|-
|style="background-color:"|
|align=left|Dmitry Nosov
|align=left|Communist Party
|
|20.74%
|-
|style="background-color:"|
|align=left|Vasilina Kulieva (incumbent)
|align=left|Liberal Democratic Party
|
|15.55%
|-
|style="background-color: "|
|align=left|Aleksandr Mikhaylov
|align=left|Party of Pensioners
|
|8.02%
|-
|style="background-color:"|
|align=left|Aleksandr Sinkevich
|align=left|Rodina
|
|3.62%
|-
| colspan="5" style="background-color:#E9E9E9;"|
|- style="font-weight:bold"
| colspan="3" style="text-align:left;" | Total
| 
| 100%
|-
| colspan="5" style="background-color:#E9E9E9;"|
|- style="font-weight:bold"
| colspan="4" |Source:
|
|}

Notes

References

Russian legislative constituencies
Politics of Zabaykalsky Krai